Darwin Olympic Sporting Club is an Australian soccer club based in Darwin, the Northern Territory. Founded in 1967, Darwin Olympic currently competes in the NorZone Premier League. The club has seen great success, becoming Premiers and Champions of 2008 in the NT Northern Zone Premier League.

The club became the first Northern Territory football club to qualify for the FFA Cup, after winning the Northern Territory-based qualifying competition. However, they were eliminated after losing 6–1 to Adelaide United in the round of 32, with striker Michael Tsounias scoring the team's lone goal in the 19th minute of the match.

Honours 
NorZone Premier League:
Premiers: 2008, 2014, 2016
Champions: 2008, 2014
Sports Minister's Cup:
Winners: 2015

References

External links 
 Official Club Website

Soccer clubs in the Northern Territory
Association football clubs established in 1967
1967 establishments in Australia
Sport in Darwin, Northern Territory